John Morris (born January 25, 1855, or February 12, 1862 – ?) was a Corporal serving in the United States Marine Corps serving aboard the  who received the Medal of Honor for saving another sailor from drowning.

Biography
Morris was born between January 25, 1855, and February 12, 1862, in Dublin, Ireland but immigrated to the United States. When the ship was at Villefranche, France, December 25, 1881 an ordinary seaman and prisoner named Robert Blizzard attempted to escape custody by jumping overboard. Corporal Morris jumped into the water afterwards to save Blizzard from drowning and for his actions he received the Medal of Honor October 18, 1884. Morris was honorably discharged from the Marine Corps April 20, 1895.

Medal of Honor citation
Rank and organization: Corporal, U.S. Marine Corps. Born: 25 January 1855, New York, N.Y. Accredited to: New York. G.O. No.: 326, 18 October 1884. For leaping overboard from the U.S. Flagship Lancaster, at Villefranche, France, 25 December 1881, and rescuing from drowning Robert Blizzard, ordinary seaman, a prisoner, who had jumped overboard.

See also

List of Medal of Honor recipients during peacetime

Notes

References
Inline

General

External links

1855 births
19th-century Irish people
People from County Dublin
Year of death missing
United States Marine Corps Medal of Honor recipients
United States Marines
Irish emigrants to the United States (before 1923)
Irish-born Medal of Honor recipients
Non-combat recipients of the Medal of Honor